Darren Debono (born 9 January 1974) is a Maltese former footballer.

Football career
Debono won 56 international caps for the Malta national team from 1996 to 2002, during which time his club was Valletta F.C. In a 2000 friendly against England, his nose was broken by Alan Shearer's elbow.

After football
After retiring from football, Debono ran a restaurant and owned fishing boats. In October 2017 he was arrested in Lampedusa and charged with involvement in smuggling oil from Libya.

References

External links
 

1974 births
Living people
Maltese footballers
Malta international footballers
Association football defenders